Pärlor åt svinen (which translates as Pearls Before Swine) is the 15th studio album by the Swedish musician Magnus Uggla. It was released on 24 October 2007. The album contains the singles "Pärlor åt svin", "Vild och skild" and "För kung och fosterland".

All lyrics by Magnus Uggla and music by Anders Henriksson och Magnus Uggla, except where listed.

Track listing
"Åh vilken härlig dag" - 3:57
"Tvättbräda" - 3:38
"Fredagskväll på Hallen" - 4:07
"Pärlor åt svin" - 4:08
"Vild och skild" - 3:23
"Borta bra men hemma bäst" - 2:53
"Det är vårt liv" - 3:28
"Coverbandens förlovade land" - 3:11
"Min igen" - 3:37
"Du och jag mot hela världen" - 4:11
"För kung och fosterland" - 3:01

Personnel
Peter Månsson - Drums, percussion, guitars, bass
Anders Hansson - Keyboards
Tommy Braic - Bass
Jesper Nordenström - Piano
Staffan Astner - Guitar and bass
Erik Arvinder - Violin and viola
Henrik Söderquist - Cello
Peter Asplund - Trumpet
Emil Heiling, Jeanetta Olsson, Emma Tyra Märta & Sofie, Magnus Rongedal och Magnus Uggla - Choir
Emil Heiling - Choir arrangement
Erik Arvinder - String arrangement

Charts

References 

2007 albums
Magnus Uggla albums